Chen Yun-ming (born 10 February 1949) is a Taiwanese alpine skier. He competed at the 1972 Winter Olympics and the 1976 Winter Olympics.

References

1949 births
Living people
Taiwanese male alpine skiers
Olympic alpine skiers of Taiwan
Alpine skiers at the 1972 Winter Olympics
Alpine skiers at the 1976 Winter Olympics
Place of birth missing (living people)
20th-century Taiwanese people